Siegsdorf is a municipality  in the district of Traunstein in Bavaria, Germany.

Famous residents 
Siegsdorf is the home town of ski jumper Markus Eisenbichler and imposter and murderer Christian Gerhartsreiter. Jimmy Carl Black of Frank Zappa's Mothers of Invention lived the last years of his life in Siegsdorf.

References

Traunstein (district)

Famous sights
Mammoths Southeast Bavarian Natural History and Mammoth Museum Siegsdorf

Traffic
Siegsdorf is located directly on the A 8 from Munich to Salzburg and can be reached via the Siegsdorf-West (AS 111) or Traunstein / Siegsdorf-Ost (AS 112) exits. Federal road 306 (Traunstein ↔ Inzell) runs east of the main town. Siegsdorf is also on the Traunstein – Ruhpolding railway line.